Wok of Love is a 2018 South Korean television series starring Lee Jun-ho, Jang Hyuk and Jung Ryeo-won. It aired on SBS from May 7 to July 17, 2018 on Mondays and Tuesdays at 22:00 (KST) for 38 episodes.

Synopsis
A charming love story of a group of men and women that is hotter than the boiling oil in a sizzling hot wok. Across the street of the six-star Giant Hotel, there stood a small and shabby Chinese restaurant called Hungry Wok. Doo Chil-sung, the owner of the restaurant and a former gangster from the Big Dipper Gang, took over the restaurant in order to provide a place of work for his former gang members. One day, former star chef Seo Poong, and bankrupt heiress Dan Sae-woo, whose lives were turned upside down overnight, came to visit Chil-sung for his help to get them back on their feet.

Cast

Main
 Lee Jun-ho as Seo Poong (31)
A tough spirit who starts from the very bottom of a hotel kitchen to becoming a top chef in a Chinese restaurant of Giant Hotel. A conspiracy resulted in the removal from his job. He ends up being a co-owner of the "Hungry Wok".
Jang Hyuk as Doo Chil-sung (40)
A former loan shark gangster from the 'Big Dipper' gang who seems intimidating but is secretly very kind hearted. After serving his time in prison, he ends up running a failing Chinese restaurant with his ever so loyal gang members.
Jung Ryeo-won as Dan Sae-woo (33)
A chaebol heiress who enjoys horseback riding and fencing but currently bankrupt. She undergoes a major change in her life after tasting a bowl of Jajangmyun at a Chinese restaurant.

Supporting

People working in Hungry Wok
Lee Mi-sook as Jin Jung-hye (53)
A beautiful and vivacious chaebol wife, ex beauty queen. She won the title for Miss Onion pageant 20 odd years previously.
Park Ji-young as Chae Seol-ja (45)
Chef of a Chinese restaurant who came to Korea from the Yanbian Korean Autonomous Prefecture 25 years ago.
Tae Hang-ho as Im Geok-jeong (34)
A timid restaurant helper who dreams about becoming a chef, and sees Seo Poong as his role model.

Members of Big Dipper Gang
Jo Jae-yoon as Oh Maeng-dal (42)
Right-hand man of Doo Chil-sung in the 'Big Dipper' gang. He began working in the Hungry Wok restaurant after being released from prison, under the orders of Chil-sung.
Kim Hyun-joon as Kwang Dong-sik (27)
A member of the 'Big Dipper' gang, the only married man among them. He is a warm-hearted person who wants to learn Chinese cooking skills as soon as possible in order not to worry his wife.
Choi Ki-sub as Jeon Yi Man (35)
A gangster working in the same restaurant who finds fighting easier than cooking 
Cha In-ha as Bong Chi-soo (25)
A member of the 'Big Dipper' gang, now a dumpling master who looks younger than his age and quick in calculations.
Choi Won-myeong as Yang Kang-ho (24)
The youngest member of the 'Big Dipper' gang who is extremely loyal and strong.

People working in Giant Hotel
Kim Sa-kwon as Yong Seung-ryong (30)
An ambitious president of Giant Hotel.
Im Won-hee as Wang Choon-soo (48)
Main chef of the Chinese restaurant of Giant Hotel.
Oh Eui-shik as Maeng Sam-seon (31)
A chef-in-training under a famous chef in the Giant Hotel. Seo Poong's rival who pretends to be his friend.
Hong Yoon-hwa as Kan Bora (27)
 The only female chef in Giant Hotel's Chinese restaurant's kitchen.
Kang Rae-yeon as Koong Rae-yeon (30)
 Hall manager of Giant Hotel who speaks fluent Chinese, and values money above friendship.

Others
Lee Mi-sook  as Kim Sun-nyeo (74)
A mysterious woman who frequently appears and disappears around Doo Chil-sung without warning. She is Chil-sung's mother who had abandoned him in a Chinese restaurant while eating sweet sour pork and jajangmyun.  
Cha Joo-young as Seok Dal-hee (31)
A plastic surgeon who has enjoyed success in her career thanks to the support of her father who runs a Chinese restaurant. Her marriage to her first love, Seo Poong is troubled, when she cheats on him.
Lee Ki-hyuk as Na Oh-jik (34)
 A successful obstetrician.
Ok Ja-yeon as Lee Ji-kyung (32)
 Animal Hospital Veterinarian
Lee Ki-young as Dan Seung-ki (57)
 Father of Dan Sae-woo who has become bankrupt
Jang Hee-ryung as Lee Boon-hong (22)
Kwang Dong-sik's wife. A room maid at the Giant Hotel. She draws attention wherever she goes due to her pretty and sexy appearance.

Special appearance
Ryu Seung-soo as Cockeye
Bae Hae-sun as Nurse
Shin Dong-yup as Immar's voice

Production
The first script reading took place in late March 2018.

Original soundtrack

Part 1

Part 2

Part 3

Part 4

Part 5

Ratings
 In the table below,  represent the lowest ratings and  represent the highest ratings.
 NR denotes that the drama did not rank in the top 20 daily programs on that date.
 TNmS stop publishing their report from June 2018.

Awards and nominations

Notes

References

External links
  
 

Seoul Broadcasting System television dramas
Korean-language television shows
2018 South Korean television series debuts
2018 South Korean television series endings
South Korean romantic comedy television series
Television shows written by Seo Sook-hyang
Television series by SM C&C